Londuimbali or Londuimbale is a town and municipality in the province of Huambo, Angola. The municipality had a population of 134,254 in 2014.

External links
Profile at geographic.org

References

Populated places in Huambo Province
Municipalities of Angola